Arachis is a genus of about 70 species of annual and perennial flowering plants in the family (Fabaceae), native to South America, and was recently assigned to the informal monophyletic Pterocarpus clade of the Dalbergieae. At least one species, the peanut (Arachis hypogaea), is a major food crop species of global importance; some of the other species are cultivated for food to a small extent in South America. Other species such as A. pintoi are cultivated worldwide as forage and soil conditioner plants, with the leaves providing high-protein feed for grazing livestock and a nitrogen source in agroforestry and permaculture systems.

Arachis species, including the peanut, are used as food plants by some Lepidoptera species, including the flame shoulder, nutmeg, and turnip moth.

Species
Arachis comprises the following sections and species:

Section Arachis

 Arachis batizocoi Krapov. & W.C. Greg.
 Arachis benensis Krapov. et al.
 Arachis cardenasii Krapov. & W.C. Greg.

 Arachis correntina (Burkart) Krapov. & W.C. Greg.
 Arachis cruziana Krapov. et al.
 Arachis decora Krapov. et al.
 Arachis diogoi Hoehne
 Arachis duranensis Krapov. & W.C. Greg.
 Arachis glandulifera Stalker
 Arachis gregoryi C. E. Simpson et al.
 Arachis helodes Mart. ex Krapov. & Rigoni
 Arachis herzogii Krapov. et al.
 Arachis hoehnei Krapov. & W.C. Greg.
 Arachis hypogaea L.—peanut
 subsp. fastigiata Waldron
 var. aequatoriana Krapov. & W. C. Greg
 var. fastigiata (Waldron) Krapov. & W. C. Greg
 var. peruviana Krapov. & W. C. Greg
 var. vulgaris Harz
 subsp. hypogaea L.
 var. hirsuta J. Kohler
 var. hypogaea L.
 Arachis ipaensis Krapov. & W.C. Greg.

 Arachis kempff-mercadoi Krapov. et al.
 Arachis krapovickasii C. E. Simpson et al.
 Arachis kuhlmannii Krapov. & W.C. Greg.
 Arachis linearifolia Valls et al.
 Arachis magna Krapov. et al.
 Arachis microsperma Krapov. et al.
 Arachis monticola Krapov. & Rigoni

 Arachis palustris Krapov. et al.
 Arachis praecox Krapov. et al.

 Arachis schininii Krapov. et al.
 Arachis simpsonii Krapov. & W.C. Greg.

 Arachis stenosperma Krapov. & W.C. Greg.
 Arachis trinitensis Krapov. & W.C. Greg.
 Arachis valida Krapov. & W.C. Greg.
 Arachis villosa Benth.
 Arachis williamsii Krapov. & W.C. Greg.

Section Caulorrhizae
 Arachis pintoi Krapov. & W.C. Greg.
 Arachis repens Handro

Section Erectoides

 Arachis archeri Krapov. & W.C. Greg.
 Arachis benthamii Handro
 Arachis brevipetiolata Krapov. & W.C. Greg.
 Arachis cryptopotamica Krapov. & W.C. Greg.
 Arachis douradiana Krapov. & W.C. Greg.
 Arachis gracilis Krapov. & W.C. Greg.
 Arachis hatschbachii Krapov. & W.C. Greg.
 Arachis hermannii Krapov. & W.C. Greg.
 Arachis major Krapov. & W.C. Greg.
 Arachis martii Handro
 Arachis oteroi Krapov. & W.C. Greg.
 Arachis paraguariensis Chodat & Hassl.
 subsp. capibarensis Krapov. & W. C. Greg
 subsp. paraguariensis Chodat & Hassl.
 Arachis porphyrocalyx Valls & C. E. Simpson
 Arachis stenophylla Krapov. & W.C. Greg.

Section Extranervosae

 Arachis burchellii Krapov. & W.C. Greg.
 Arachis lutescens Krapov. & Rigoni
 Arachis macedoi Krapov. & W.C. Greg.
 Arachis marginata Gardner
 Arachis pietrarellii Krapov. & W.C. Greg.
 Arachis prostrata Benth.—grassnut
 Arachis retusa Krapov. et al.
 Arachis setinervosa Krapov. & W.C. Greg.
 Arachis submarginata Valls et al.
 Arachis villosulicarpa Hoehne

Section Heteranthae
 Arachis dardani Krapov. & W.C. Greg.

 Arachis giacomettii Krapov. et al.
 Arachis interrupta Valls & C. E. Simpson
 Arachis pusilla Benth.
 Arachis seridoensis Valls et al.

 Arachis sylvestris (A. Chev.) A. Chev.

Section Procumbentes

 Arachis appressipila Krapov. & W. C. Greg.
 Arachis chiquitana Krapov. et al.
 Arachis kretschmeri Krapov. & W.C. Greg.
 Arachis hassleri Krapov. et al.
 Arachis lignosa (Chodat & Hassl.) Krapov. & W.C. Greg.
 Arachis matiensis Krapov. et al.
 Arachis pflugeae C. E. Simpson et al.
 Arachis rigonii Krapov. & W.C. Greg.
 Arachis subcoriacea Krapov. & W.C. Greg.
 Arachis vallsii Krapov. & W.C. Greg.

Section Rhizomatosae
 Arachis nitida Valls et al.

Series Prorhizomatosae
 Arachis burkartii Handro

Series Rhizomatosae

 Arachis glabrata Benth.
 var. glabrata Benth.
 var. hagenbeckii (Harms) F. J. Herm.

 Arachis pseudovillosa (Chodat & Hassl.) Krapov. & W.C. Greg.

Section Trierectoides
 Arachis guaranitica Chodat & Hassl.
 Arachis tuberosa Benth.

Section Triseminatae
 Arachis triseminata Krapov. & W.C. Greg.

Hybrids
 Arachis × batizogaea Krapov. & A. Fernández

References

External links

Plant Genetic Resources Newsletter: Morphological characterization of Arachis species of section Arachis

 
Fabaceae genera
Forages